The 2016–17 Andebol 1 is the 65th season of the Andebol 1, Portugal's top-tier handball league. A total of fourteen teams contest this season's league, which is an increase of two teams from last season.

The season began on 3 September 2016 and ended on 18 June 2017.

ABC were the defending champions, but failed to revalidate the title, as Sporting CP won this season's league, achieving its 20th league title.

Format
The competition format for the 2016–17 season consists of two phases, both played in a home-and-away double round-robin system. At the end of the first phase, the six best-ranked teams compete in Group A of the final phase to determine the champion. The remaining eight teams play in Group B, which will determine the two teams to be relegated to the Second Division.

Teams

A total of fourteen teams contest the 2016–17 Andebol 1, representing an additional two teams as compared to the previous season. Among them are all sides from the previous season, except for Passos Manuel, who relinquished their participation due to budget restrictions.  The remaining three teams – Boa-Hora, Arsenal and São Mamede – were promoted from the 2015–16 Second Division.

First phase

Standings

Results

Final phase

Group A

Group B

References

External links
 Portuguese Handball Federation 

Andebol 1
Portugal
2016 in Portuguese sport
2017 in Portuguese sport